Kamaz Typhoon is a family of Russian multi-functional, modular, armoured Mine-Resistant Ambush Protected vehicles manufactured by the Russian truck builder Kamaz. The Typhoon family is part of Russia's Typhoon program. As of  2021, the number of Typhoons in the Russian Armed Forces fleet was about 330 units of Typhoon-K.

History
The development of the "Typhoon" vehicle family began in 2010, when Minister of Russian Federation Armed Forces approved the "Development of Russian Federation Armed Forces military vehicles for the period until 2020" program and started the Typhoon MRAP program. In 2012 the first contract between Russian Ministry of Armed Forces and Kamaz to buy Typhoons was signed.

12 Typhoons took part in Russian Victory Day military parade in 2014. State tests were completed in 2019.

Description

Russia claims NATO STANAG 4569 level 3b protection. Combined set of ceramics and steel armor, which protects against armor-piercing bullets of caliber 14.5 × 114 mm. Includes 128.5-129.0 mm thick bulletproof glass with a transparency of 70%, developed by the "Magistral Ltd" and tested at the Research Institute of Steel, withstanding 2 shots spaced at 280–300 mm in the shelling of KPVT with speed of bullet 911 m / s at the instant of contact with the glass. Bulletproof exceed the highest demands on available GOST (GOST R 51136 and GOST R 50963), in which the highest level - a fire of armor-piercing bullets B-32, 7.62 × 54 mm from the SVD. During the production, Magistral LTD focused on western standards level IV STANAG 4569 - guaranteed protection in the shelling of armor-piercing ammunition B-32, 14.5 × 114 mm from a distance of 200 m with a bullet velocity 891–931 m / s. Reservations withstand hit of 30-mm ammunition. There are bullet-proof tires 16.00R20 with explosion inserts diverting the blast wave, with automatic pumping of air and controlled pressure to 4.5 atmospheres. Provided loopholes for firing from small arms, remotely controlled machine gun. Unification with other family cars is 86%.

Seats are equipped with personal weapons holders, seat belts and head restraints. They are attached to the roof module, to reduce the impact of mines / bombs. Inside the module is installed set for filtering FVUA-100A and air conditioning. On the roof there are escape hatches in case the vehicle rolls over. Passengers exit through the ramp at the stern of the vehicle or through a side door.

Surveillance and communication

In the car the Combat Information and Control System (CICS) GALS-D1M to monitor and control the operation of the engine, calculating machines roll, tilt, road speed, location, etc. The independent hydropneumatic suspension allows the driver to change the ride height on the road, using remote control within 400 mm. KAMAZ-63968 is equipped with five cameras for review the troop unit and cockpit. Cabin is equipped with folding displays, showing how the state of the car is, and an external review.

Technical specifications and performance

Crew: Depends on configuration, up to 16.
Axles: 6×6, two front axles, rear one is subject to the normal weight distribution of machine (cab is very heavy).
Length:  
Width:  
Height:
 cab: 
 body/fuselage: 
Wheelbase: n/a
Ground clearance: Adjustable
Turning radius: less than 
Lifting angle: 23-30° 
Wheel rotation angle: 39°
Tires  - 16.00R20, with special Run-flat tire with inserts diverting the blast wave, using an automatic tire inflation pressure level and the change in the tire (1 to 4.5 atm) depending on the road surface.
Curb weight: 21 tons, gross weight - 24 tons
Maximum speed, km/h: 
Cruising range: 
Fuel consumption per 100 km: less than

Variants

4x4 Family
Kamaz 5388 - 4x4 Armoured chassis cab

Kamaz 5388 - 4x4 Armoured personnel carrier

Kamaz 53888 - 4x4 Armoured cargo vehicle

6x6 Family
Kamaz 6396 - 6x6 Armoured chassis cab

Kamaz 6396 - 6x6 Armoured cargo vehicle

Kamaz 63968 - 6x6 Armoured personnel carrier

8x8 Family

Kamaz 6398 - 8x8 Armoured cargo vehicle

Kamaz 63988 - 8x8 Armoured personnel carrier

Derivatives

Kamaz-63969
Solid-body, 6x6 wheeled amphibious armoured personnel carrier (APC) with a remote-controlled weapon station.

Gallery

See also

Ural Typhoon - Ural Trucks Typhoon variant
ZIL Karatel

Notes

Wheeled armoured fighting vehicles
Wheeled armoured personnel carriers
Military engineering vehicles
Armoured fighting vehicles of Russia
Kamaz
Military vehicles introduced in the 2010s
Armoured personnel carriers of the post–Cold War period